The Maidstone Club is a private country club on the Atlantic Ocean in the village of East Hampton, New York. Maidstone has both an 18-hole and nine-hole private golf course.

History

The Club derives its name from the original name for East Hampton, which was Maidstone, named after Maidstone in England. It was founded as a 7-hole course in 1894 and expanded to eighteen holes in 1899. The Club was the summer retreat of New York City’s most wealthy and socially connected families. Maidstone is considered to be the most elite, prestigious and difficult to get into of all the clubs in "The Hamptons".

Jews were not admitted as members until the late 1970s. Through the 1990s and early 2000s, journalists reported that there were no Black members.

Several notable people have inquired about membership over the years and were summarily prevented from joining the Club. In the 1950s, Groucho Marx was able to play as a member guest but was turned down as a potential member. George Plimpton and Diana Ross were also shunned. Ross was married to billionaire Norwegian shipping magnate Arne Næss, Jr., a member at Maidstone, however he resigned when his wife was denied membership. Donald Trump was a temporary member in the early 1980s, but turned down as a permanent member. 

Willie Dunn laid out the first course in 1894; it was but a rudimentary seven-hole layout. Seth Raynor drew up re-design plans in 1921. Then in 1924 Willie Park, Jr. and his brother Jack designed the  Gardiner Peninsula addition. The expansion resulted in the club having two 18-hole courses, but this was reduced to the current 27-hole layout by the hurricane of 1938. Ben Crenshaw performed extensive renovations in 2012.

The Parks' routing on the 80 acres on Gardiner’s Peninsula and the remaining 50 acres introduces multiple hazards at various angles, including a marsh, Hook Pond, sand dunes, beach grass, reeds, well-placed bunkers, out of bounds and the ever-present wind.

In 2014, Maidstone was ranked #37 in Golf Magazines "Top 100 Courses in the U.S." list, and #67 in their "Top 100 Courses in the World" list.

West Course scorecard

Facilities
The Maidstone Club features a private beach, pool, tennis house, and club house in addition to the golf course.

References

External links
 Golf Club Atlas Description of Course
 Maidstone Club - LongIslandGolfNews.com

1891 establishments in New York (state)
East Hampton (town), New York
Golf clubs and courses in New York (state)
Sports venues in Long Island
Sports venues in Suffolk County, New York